Robert Lindstedt (born 19 March 1977) is a Swedish former professional tennis player who specialized in doubles. He turned professional in 1998, and reached a career-high doubles ranking of world No. 3 in May 2013. Lindstedt won his first Grand Slam title at the 2014 Australian Open with partner Łukasz Kubot. He has also reached four finals at the Wimbledon Championships: in 2010, 2011 and 2012 alongside Horia Tecău in men's doubles, and in 2019 with Jeļena Ostapenko in mixed doubles.

Lindstedt has won 23 doubles titles on the ATP Tour, including one at Masters 1000 level at the 2012 Western & Southern Open. He represented Sweden in the Davis Cup from 2007 to 2021, as well as at the 2012 Olympic Games.

Career

Early years

Lindstedt played college tennis in the United States, playing first at Fresno State University before following coach Peter Smith to Pepperdine University, where he completed his collegiate career. While at Pepperdine, he teamed with Kelly Gullett in doubles competition. They were runners-up at the 1998 NCAA individual competition at the University of Georgia, receiving all-America honors for the second year in a row.

2007–2008
Lindstedt won two doubles titles in 2007, the first in Mumbai with Jarkko Nieminen against Indian Rohan Bopanna and Pakistani Aisam-ul-Haq Qureshi. The second came paired with Jordan Kerr in Tokyo, beating Frank Dancevic and Stephen Huss. In 2008. Lindstedt paired with Marc Gicquel to win the Washington tournament and was a semifinalist at the ATP Master Series event in Indian Wells with Richard Gasquet, in Tokyo with Jordan Kerr, and in Kitzbühel with Jürgen Melzer.

Robert was part of a team including Robin Söderling, Thomas Johansson, and coach Peter Carlsson who beat the Russian tennis team (of Dmitry Tursunov, Igor Andreev, and Mikhail Youzhny) 2–1 in the ARAG World Team Cup in Düsseldorf.

2010: Four titles, First Wimbledon final with Tecău
Lindstedt reached his first Grand Slam final at Wimbledon, with long-time partner Horia Tecău.

2011: Second Wimbledon final with Tecău
Lindstedt reached his second Grand Slam final again at Wimbledon with Horia Tecău.

2012: Four titles including a Masters 1000, Third Wimbledon final in a row, Top 10 year-end ranking 
Lindstedt and Horia Tecău of Romania reached their third Wimbledon final in a row. They also defeated Alexander Peya of Austria and Bruno Soares of Brazil to win the Swedish Open.

2013: World No. 3 in doubles 
Robert and Nenad Zimonjic of Serbia partnered during the first three months; they won the Rotterdam Open together.
Later, Lindstedt played with Daniel Nestor and reached the final of the Barcelona Open (tennis) on clay at their second tournament together. Lindstedt scored his first win over the Bryan brothers with Nestor before they stopped playing together.

2014: Australian Open doubles champion with Kubot
Lindstedt and Łukasz Kubot of Poland won the Australian Open together, after failing to win a match before the Grand Slam event.

2021: Retirement
His last ATP tournament in his career was the 2021 Stockholm Open where he reached the quarterfinals with Swedish compatriot Andre Goransson. He also partnered Goransson in the Davis Cup.

Doubles performance timeline

Significant finals

Grand Slam finals

Doubles: 4 (1–3)

Mixed doubles: 1 (0–1)

Masters 1000 finals

Doubles: 2 (1–1)

ATP career finals

Doubles: 48 (23 titles, 25 runner-ups)

Footnotes

Wins over top 10 players

Doubles
He has a  record against players who were, at the time the match was played, ranked in the top 10.

World TeamTennis

Lindstedt enters his third season with World TeamTennis in 2020, after making his debut with the Washington Kastles in 2018, and playing a season with the Springfield Lasers in 2019. It was announced he will be returning to the Springfield Lasers during the 2020 WTT season set to begin 12 July.

References

External links

 
 
 

1977 births
Living people
People from Sundbyberg Municipality
Swedish male tennis players
Tennis players at the 2012 Summer Olympics
Olympic tennis players of Sweden
Grand Slam (tennis) champions in men's doubles
Australian Open (tennis) champions
Pepperdine Waves men's tennis players
Sportspeople from Stockholm County